Menon is a genus of medium-sized sea snails, marine gastropod mollusks in the family Eulimidae.

Species
There is only one known species within this genus:
 Menon anceps Hedley, 1900

References

External links
 To World Register of Marine Species

Eulimidae